Scaeosopha dentivalvula is a species of moth of the family Cosmopterigidae. It is found on Sulawesi.

The wingspan is about 17 mm. The ground colour of the forewings is whitish-yellow, overlaid with brown and black spots circled by yellow as well as with short brown streaks along the veins. The hindwings are deep yellowish-brown.

Etymology
The species name refers to the toothlike ventroapical process on the valva and is derived from the Latin prefix denti- (meaning tooth) and valvulus (meaning valvule).

References

Moths described in 2012
Scaeosophinae